EuroLeague Final Four records are the records of the EuroLeague's Final Four tournament. The EuroLeague is the European-wide top-tier level men's professional club basketball league. The EuroLeague Final Four has been held every year since 1988, as it was held for the first time in the modern EuroLeague era, at the conclusion of the league's 1987–88 season, with the 1988 EuroLeague Final Four.

Individual records (1988 – 2022)

Points scored

Rebounds

Assists

EuroLeague Final Four All-Time Top 11 Scorers (1988 – 2022)

EuroLeague Final Four All-Time Top 10 Assist (1988 – 2022)

EuroLeague Final Four All-Time Total Rebounds (1988 – 2022)

See also
EuroLeague
EuroLeague Final Four

References

Works cited
 Final Four records

External links
 EuroLeague Official Web Page
 InterBasket EuroLeague Basketball Forum
 EuroLeague's Youtube Channel

EuroLeague statistics
Basketball